The Mona Intercept is a thriller novel by Donald Hamilton.

Plot summary
Cuban exile Jimmy Columbus uses hijacking on the high seas, drugs, and murder to fuel his dreams of an empire.

Publication history
1980, US, Fawcett Gold Medal, paperback

External links
Review by Bruce Grossman, Bookgasm

1980 American novels
American thriller novels
Novels by Donald Hamilton